Thomas Wills (1826 – 1907) was an Ontario political figure. He represented Hastings West in the Legislative Assembly of Ontario as a Conservative member from 1875 to 1879.

He was born in Salisbury, England in 1826 (one source indicates that he was born in Newfoundland) and was educated there. In 1852, he married Anna Maria Levesconte. He served as clerk for Hastings County and was lieutenant-colonel for the local militia. Wills ran unsuccessfully for the same seat in the House of Commons in 1874.

External links

The Canadian parliamentary companion, 1879, CH Mackintosh

References

1826 births
1907 deaths
Progressive Conservative Party of Ontario MPPs